Reserve Creek is a town located in north-eastern New South Wales, Australia, in the Tweed Shire.

Demographics
In the  the population of Reserve Creek was 213, 48.4% female and 51.6% male.

The median age of the Reserve Creek population was 45 years of age, 8 years above the Australian median.

83.9% of people living in Reserve Creek were born in Australia. The other top responses for country of birth were India 2.8%, New Zealand 2.4%, England 1.4%, Italy 1.4%, Netherlands 1.4% and 9.4% other countries.

91.1% of people spoke only English at home; the next most common languages were 2.8% Punjabi, 1.4% Italian and 4.2% other languages.

References 

Suburbs of Tweed Heads, New South Wales